CABSAT is an annual largest broadcast digital media and satellite expo in the Middle East and Africa.

References

External links

2019 festivals
Events in Dubai
21st century in Dubai
Mass media events
Annual events
2010s in Dubai